The Shire of Nerang was a local government area in South East Queensland, Australia. The shire existed as a local government entity from 1879 until 1949.

History
On 11 November 1879, the Nerang Division was created as one of 74 divisions within Queensland under the Divisional Boards Act 1879 with a population of 652.

On 6 July 1883, Southport Division was formed from part of subdivision No. 1 of Nerang Division and part of subdivision No. 1 of Coomera Division.

With the passage of the Local Authorities Act 1902, the Nerang Division became the Shire of Nerang on 31 March 1903.

On 12 June 1914, part of Nerang Shire was separated to enable the establishment of the Town of Coolangatta.

In 1927 the council met in their offices at Mudgeeraba.

Amalgamations in 1948
On 9 December 1948, as part of a major reorganisation of local government in South East Queensland, an Order in Council replacing ten former local government areas between the City of Brisbane and the New South Wales border with only four. The former ten were:
 Beaudesert
 Beenleigh
 Cleveland
 Coolangatta
 Coomera
 Nerang
 Southport
 Tamborine
 Tingalpa
 Waterford

The four resulting local government areas were:
 the new Shire of Albert: a merger of Beenleigh, Coomera, Nerang (except for the Burleigh Heads area), the southern part of Tingalpa and the eastern part of Waterford
 Town of South Coast, an amalgamation of the Towns of Southport and Coolangatta with the Burleigh Heads part of Nerang (which later became City of Gold Coast)
 an enlarged Shire of Beaudesert, an amalgamation of Beaudesert and Tamborine with the western part of Waterford
 the new Redland Shire, an amalgamation of Cleveland and the northern part of Tingalpa (which later became Redland City)

The Order came into effect on 10 June 1949, when the first elections were held.

Chairmen

 1880-1881: Walter John Browne 
1881-1884: Robert Hope
1914 - 1917: William Stephens
 1917— March 1928: Walter James Brake (died in office)
April 1928 - 1948 (died in office): William Godfrey Holden (Goff) Rudd
1948 - 1949: Eric John Gaven, last chairman of Nerang Shire Council and first chairman of Albert Shire Council

William Stephens, a Member of the Queensland Legislative Assembly and a Member of the Queensland Legislative Council and mayor of the South Brisbane City Council, was a long-term councillor at Nerang, first serving in 1882 and serving for a total of 36 years.

References

Further reading

External links
 

Former local government areas of Queensland
1879 establishments in Australia
1949 disestablishments in Australia